Sinners Like Me is the debut studio album from American country music artist Eric Church. It was released on July 18, 2006, through Capitol Records Nashville. Singles released from the album include "How 'Bout You", "Two Pink Lines", "Guys Like Me", and the title track, which respectively reached No. 14, No. 19, No. 17 and No. 51 on the Hot Country Songs charts. Although not released as a single, the track "Lightning" was made into a music video, which aired on the networks CMT and GAC. The album has sold 590,000 copies in the US as of November 29, 2013, and it was certified Platinum by the RIAA for a million units in combined sales and streams on April 29, 2019.

Track listing

Personnel

Casey Beathard – choir
Brett Beavers – choir
Richard Bennett – electric guitar
Katherine Blasingame – choir
Bruce Bouton – pedal steel guitar
Caldwell County Choir – choir
Brandon Church – choir
Eric Church – choir, lead vocals
Perry Coleman – background vocals
Dan Dugmore – dobro, pedal steel guitar
Chris Feinstein – bass guitar
Kenny Greenberg – electric guitar
Merle Haggard – vocals on "Pledge Allegiance to the Hag"
Jason Hall – tuba
Aubrey Haynie – fiddle
Kevin Heeney – choir
Michael Heeney – choir
Sean Heeney – choir
Mark Hill – bass guitar
Jay Joyce – bass guitar, acoustic guitar, electric guitar, keyboards, piano
Wally Mitchum – choir
Patricia Norman – choir
Russ Pahl – pedal steel guitar
Mickey Raphael – harmonica
Giles Reaves – djembe, marimbula, pump organ, shaker
Tammy Rogers – fiddle
Mindy Smith – background vocals
Ed Smoak – choir
Jeremy Spillman – choir
Bryan Sutton – banjo, acoustic guitar, mandolin
Russell Terrell – background vocals 
Chris Thile – mandolin 
Jay Williams – choir
Craig Wright – cajón, drums

Charts

Weekly charts

Year-end charts

Certifications

References

External links
[ Sinners Like Me] at Allmusic

2006 debut albums
Albums produced by Jay Joyce 
Capitol Records albums
Eric Church albums